New York's 88th State Assembly district is one of the 150 districts in the New York State Assembly. It has been represented by Democrat Amy Paulin since 2000.

Geography
District 88 is in Westchester County. It contains Scarsdale, Eastchester, Tuckahoe, Bronxville, Pelham, Pelham Manor, and parts of New Rochelle and White Plains.

Recent election results

2022

2020

2018

2016

2014

2012

2010

References 

88
Westchester County, New York